The Castle is a 1997 Australian comedy film directed by Rob Sitch, and written by Sitch, Santo Cilauro, Tom Gleisner and Jane Kennedy of Working Dog Productions, all veteran writers and performers on ABC's The Late Show and The D-Generation. The film stars Michael Caton, Anne Tenney, Stephen Curry, Anthony Simcoe, Sophie Lee and Wayne Hope as the Kerrigan family, as well as Tiriel Mora, Robyn Nevin, Eric Bana, Costas Kilias and Charles 'Bud' Tingwell.

The film's title is based upon the English saying, repeatedly referred to in the film, "a man's home is his castle". Its humour plays on the national self-image, most notably the concept of working-class Australians and their place in modern Australia.

It grossed A$10,326,428 at the box office in Australia.

Plot
The Kerrigan home, in the outer Melbourne blue-collar suburb of Coolaroo, is filled with love as well as pride in their modest lifestyle, but their happiness is threatened when developers attempt the compulsory acquisition of their house to expand the neighbouring airport.

The Kerrigan house is built in a largely undeveloped housing tract, on a toxic landfill, and directly adjacent to an airport runway. Despite all this, sweet-natured family patriarch Darryl (Michael Caton) believes that he lives in the lap of luxury. Blissfully unaware of his family's lack of style or sophistication, he busies himself by driving a tow truck, racing greyhounds, and constantly adding tacky renovations to the house. The rest of the Kerrigan clan shares and supports his enthusiasm in every way.

One day, a property valuer arrives to inspect the house. Though he has no wish to sell, Darryl points out all the features of the property, believing they will add value to the appraisal. A few weeks later, he receives a letter informing him of the compulsory acquisition of his house for the sum of $70,000. His neighbours (elderly Jack, divorcee Yvonne, and Farouk and Tabulah, recent immigrants from Lebanon) all receive similar notices. Believing on common principle that the government cannot evict him unwillingly from his treasured home, Darryl attempts to fight the eviction. Agents from the airport try to bribe and bully the family into giving up, but their actions only stiffen the Kerrigans' resolve. Darryl hires an incompetent lawyer acquaintance, Dennis Denuto (Tiriel Mora), but Dennis's meagre argument that the eviction goes against "the vibe" of the Constitution does not go well in court. While awaiting the court's final decision, Darryl makes pleasant small talk with a man whom he meets outside the courthouse, Lawrence Hammill (Bud Tingwell), who has come to watch his barrister son perform in court in a different case. The court rejects the family's appeal and gives them two weeks to vacate. The purchase price for the home is scarcely enough to cover a small apartment. Dejected in defeat, the family begins to pack.

A new breath of hope comes with the surprise arrival of Lawrence, who reveals himself to be a retired Queen's Counsel. Lawrence has taken an interest in the Kerrigans' case, in part due to his extensive experience in constitutional law, and offers to argue before the High Court of Australia on their behalf, for the public good. Lawrence makes a persuasive case that the Kerrigans have the right to just terms of compensation for acquisition of property under Section 51(xxxi) of the Australian Constitution. He closes by paraphrasing Darryl's own comments that his house is more than just a structure of bricks and mortar, but a home built with love and shared memories. The court rules in favour of the Kerrigans, and their case becomes a landmark precedent on the subject. An epilogue shows that the Kerrigans continue to prosper happily, and Lawrence becomes a lasting friend of the family.

Cast
 Michael Caton as Darryl Kerrigan, the father
 Anne Tenney as Sal Kerrigan, the mother
 Stephen Curry as Dale Kerrigan, the youngest son, digger of holes, and the film's narrator
 Sophie Lee as Tracey Petropoulous (née Kerrigan), the family's only daughter, a newlywed hairdresser
 Eric Bana as Con Petropoulous, Tracey's new husband, an accountant and amateur kickboxer
 Anthony Simcoe as Steve Kerrigan, the second-oldest son and an apprentice mechanic
 Wayne Hope as Wayne Kerrigan, the black sheep, who is serving time for armed robbery but is loved by his family regardless
 Tiriel Mora as Dennis Denuto, a bumbling small-time lawyer who previously failed to defend Wayne on his charge
 Costas Kilias as Farouk, the Kerrigans' neighbour
 Charles 'Bud' Tingwell as Lawrence Hammill QC, a retired barrister who comes to the Kerrigans' aid by representing them pro bono
 John Flaus as Sgt. Kennedy, a local police officer
 Tony Martin as Adam Hammill, Lawrence's son (brief, mostly non-speaking cameo)
 Larry Emdur appears as himself (at the time, Emdur was host of the Australian iteration of The Price Is Right)
 Ian Ross appears as himself (at the time, Ross was a Channel Nine newsreader)
 Bryan Dawe appears as the lawyer Ron Graham

Production
According to Santo Cilauro, the film took five weeks from original inception to final cut. The screenplay was written in two weeks, shot in ten days and taken to rough cut in two weeks.

The Castle was filmed mostly in Melbourne, Victoria. The external shots of the Kerrigan household were shot at 3 Dagonet St, Strathmore, and airport footage was shot at Essendon Airport and Melbourne Airport. Location shots of Brunswick feature in the film, including Brunswick Town Hall and Rocky Porcino Pharmacy at 720 Sydney Rd (Dennis's office). Melbourne's 200 Queen Street and the Supreme Court of Victoria are featured along with the High Court of Australia in Canberra. Some of the film is set in Bonnie Doon, and a very small portion of it was shot there.

The name Kerrigan was chosen for the family so that tow trucks could be borrowed from an existing Melbourne tow-truck company with that name. The company still operates today.

In January 2011, 3491 Maintongoon Road, Bonnie Doon was listed for sale. The property appeared in the film as the Kerrigan family holiday house. The property's real estate agent reported that many people called and after requesting the vendor's asking price, replied with a quote from the movie: "Tell him he's dreamin'."

Legal principles
The film refers to the land rights movement of Aboriginal Australians, with Darryl Kerrigan drawing an explicit parallel between his struggle and theirs. It also draws on one of the few rights protected in the Australian Constitution for subject matter, the right to just terms compensation for acquisition of property under s51(xxxi). Also interspersed in the film are many references to famous Australian Constitutional Law Cases, such as Mabo and the Tasmanian Dams Case. The film also deals with section 109 of the Constitution which provides that in the case of an inconsistency between Federal and State law, the Federal law shall prevail to the extent of the inconsistency.

For the purpose of the drama, some of the relevant legal principles are simplified. For example, the law relating to compulsory acquisition can be complicated and raises more questions than are noted in the film. Section 51 (xxxi) of the Commonwealth Constitution applies to acquisitions only by the Commonwealth, not by the States, and the latter are more likely to compulsorily acquire property. Similarly, in contrast to Kerrigan's idea that the value he places on his own home cannot be bought, the law regularly places a monetary value on intangible human values.

Themes
The Castle can be seen as a social study on the lives and aspirations of the inhabitants of suburban Australia. The central character, Darryl Kerrigan, ties into the stereotypical depiction of an "Aussie battler", a man who will protect and serve his family through bold and sometimes ruthless assertion. The Aussie battler will at times face challenges or adversity, often in the face of oppressive government or economic hardship. Kerrigan, and to a lesser extent his wife and children, are committed to their pursuit of the Australian Dream, a concept considered somewhat outdated. The Castle has also been seen as "a canonised text for Australian settler identity".

Release

Alternative versions
In the US version, there were several minor changes to dialogue. "Rissole" was changed to "meatloaf", "two-stroke" was changed to "diesel", references to the Australian TV show Hey Hey It's Saturday were changed to the more generic Funniest Home Videos (which existed in both markets), and brand names of various cars in the driveway were changed from uniquely Australian cars like the Camira, to ones sold in both countries like the Corolla.

Australian broadcasts for "before-8:30pm screening" has profanity either removed or, where possible, masked by aircraft noises or redubbed when lip movements are not visible. When shown after 8:30pm, all explicit language is intact.

Box office
The Castle previewed on 34 screens in Australia and grossed A$122,256 ranking 14th at the Australian box office for the week. It officially opened on 10 April 1997 on 86 screens and grossed A$1,137,703 for the week, ranking fourth. Its per screen average of A$13,229 was second only just behind the opening of the special edition of The Empire Strikes Back. It became one of the top-10-grossing Australian films of all time with a gross of A$10,326,439 at the box office in Australia, over 13 times its A$750,000 budget.

Paramount Pictures bought distribution rights to the United Kingdom and South Africa, and was also offered North American distribution rights, which it refused to buy. A bidding war for North American rights took place, with Gramercy Pictures, Miramax Films and LIVE Entertainment being the frontrunners and Columbia TriStar also expressing interest in buying the rights. Ultimately, North American rights were bought by Miramax for a rumoured $6 million. The film grossed $877,621 in the United States and Canada.

Critical reception
In Australia, the film received critical acclaim, considered an iconic classic and is frequently listed as one of the greatest Australian films ever made. In 2011, Time Out London named it the 25th-greatest comedy film of all time. The film is a text studied in secondary education in Australia.

The Castle received positive reviews from overseas critics. It has an 87% approval rating from review-aggregation website Rotten Tomatoes, based on 39 reviews, with a weighted average of 6.99/10. Roger Ebert gave the film 3 stars out of 4, calling it "one of those comic treasures like The Full Monty and Waking Ned Devine that shows its characters in the full bloom of glorious eccentricity". Elsewhere around the world, especially in non-English-speaking countries not familiar with Australian humour, mores or issues, the film made little impact.

Accolades

See also

 Australian constitutional law
 Cinema of Australia
 Mabo v Queensland (No 2)

References

External links

 
 
 The Castle at Oz Movies
 The Castle movie quotes
 
 
 
 The Castle at the National Film and Sound Archive
 DVD release details for "The Castle: Poolroom Edition" (includes R1 vs. R4 comparison) from MichaelDVD.com.au

1997 films
APRA Award winners
1997 comedy-drama films
Australian comedy-drama films
Films about real estate holdout
Australian aviation films
Courtroom films
Films set in Melbourne
Films set in Victoria (Australia)
Films shot in Melbourne
1997 directorial debut films
1990s English-language films
Roadshow Entertainment films

it:Casa dolce casa (film)